This page list topics related to Malta.



0-9

A

B

C

Ċ

D

E

F

Ġ

G

Għ

H

Ħ

I

J

K

L

M

N

O

P

Q

R

S

T

U

V

W

X

Y

Ż

Z

Lists

See also
Lists of country-related topics - similar lists for other countries

Malta